Madhya Pradesh State Highway 9 (MP SH 9) is a State Highway running from Manikpur, Uttar Pradesh via Semaria town in Rewa district and terminating at Rewa, Madhya Pradesh.

See Also
List of state highways in Madhya Pradesh

References

State Highways in Madhya Pradesh